The 1983 All-Ireland Senior Club Camogie Championship for the leading clubs in the women's team field sport of camogie was won by Buffers Alley from Wexford, who defeated Glenamaddy from Galway in the final, played at Monamolin . It was the third in a record sequence of four in a row won by the club.

Arrangements
The championship was organised on the traditional provincial system used in Gaelic Games since the 1880s, with Swatragh and Croagh-Kilfinny winning the championships of the other two provinces.

The Final
Alley started with 1-4 to no reply and ran out easy winners in the final.

Final stages

References

External links
 Camogie Association

1983 in camogie
1983